Anna Mohrová (born 15 July 1944) is a Czech alpine skier. She competed in three events at the 1968 Winter Olympics.

References

1944 births
Living people
Czech female alpine skiers
Olympic alpine skiers of Czechoslovakia
Alpine skiers at the 1968 Winter Olympics
Sportspeople from Prague